Kuressaare Sports Centre is a sport hall in Kuressaare, Saare County, Estonia. The centre was opened in 2004  and is managed by Saaremaa Spordikool.

The centre is the home arena for the volleyball club Saaremaa VK.

References

External links
 

Sports venues in Estonia
Indoor arenas in Estonia
Buildings and structures in Estonia
Kuressaare
Volleyball venues in Estonia
Basketball venues in Estonia
2004 establishments in Estonia
Sports venues completed in 2004